The Goat / The Bells Have Stopped Ringing is the first single by the darkwave band Sopor Aeternus & the Ensemble of Shadows. The two songs are outtakes from 2000, during the sessions for Songs from the Inverted Womb. The single was released alongside, and also included in, the rarities box set Like a Corpse standing in Desperation.

"The Goat" heavily incorporates the 3rd movement of Frédéric Chopin's Piano Sonata No. 2 in B-flat minor, Op. 35, known famously as the "Funeral March".

Track listing

Personnel
 Alexander Gröb - trumpet
 Carsten Weilnau - trombone
 Eugene de la Fontaine - tuba
 Anna-Varney Cantodea - vocals, all other instruments and programming

2005 singles
Sopor Aeternus and The Ensemble of Shadows